Kansas's 33rd Senate district is one of 40 districts in the Kansas Senate. It has been represented by Republican Mary Jo Taylor since 2017; Taylor was defeated in the 2020 Republican primary by State Representative Alicia Straub.

Geography
District 33 covers a large swath of rural west-central Kansas, including all of Barton, Edwards, Kiowa, Lane, Ness, Pawnee, Pratt, Rush, Scott, and Stafford Counties as well as parts of Hodgeman and Rice Counties. Communities in the district include Great Bend, Pratt, Larned, Scott City, and Ness City.

The district overlaps with Kansas's 1st and 4th congressional districts, and with the 108th, 109th, 112th, 113th, 117th, and 118th districts of the Kansas House of Representatives.

Recent election results

2020

2016

2012

Federal and statewide results in District 33

References

33
Barton County, Kansas
Edwards County, Kansas
Hodgeman County, Kansas
Kiowa County, Kansas
Lane County, Kansas
Ness County, Kansas
Pawnee County, Kansas
Pratt County, Kansas
Rice County, Kansas
Rush County, Kansas
Scott County, Kansas
Stafford County, Kansas